balls are a folk art form and Japanese craft, originating in China and introduced to Japan around the 7th century A.D.  means "hand ball" in Japanese. Balls made from embroidery may be used in handball games and other such similar games (e.g., hacky sack). An accessory similar in appearance (and constructed with similar techniques and materials), but with the addition of a hand-strap (made with either satin cord or ribbon) and a tassel, can serve as an accessory for a kimono, as a kimono bag.

History
Historically,  were constructed from the remnants of old kimono. Pieces of silk fabric would be wadded up to form a ball, and then the wad would be wrapped with strips of fabric. As time passed, traditional  became an art, with the functional stitching becoming more decorative and detailed, until the balls displayed intricate embroidery.

Tradition

 are highly valued and cherished gifts, symbolizing deep friendship and loyalty. Also, the brilliant colors and threads used are symbolic of wishing the recipient a brilliant and happy life. Traditionally, becoming a craftsman in Japan was a tedious process.

Traditionally,  were often given to children from their parents on New Year's Day. Inside the tightly wrapped layers of each ball, the mother would have placed a small piece of paper with a goodwill wish for her child. The child would never be told what wish their mother had made while making the ball.

Alternately, some balls contained "noisemakers" consisting of rice grains or bells to add to the play value. It is said that traditional temari were wrapped so tightly they would bounce.

Principles of construction
All  are made according to some specific method of construction that involves dividing the  into a number of sections through the use of temporarily placed pins and permanently placed threads. There are three "standard divisions" which are recognized: simple division, 8-combination division, and 10-combination division.

References

External links 
 

Chinese games
Embroidery
Japanese folk art
Japanese games
Textile arts of Japan
Japanese words and phrases
Traditional toys
Japanese stitching techniques